Lia Catherine Thomas (born ) is an American swimmer. In 2017, she began studying at the University of Pennsylvania, from which she graduated in May 2022. She competed on the university's men's swim team from 2017 to 2020, and on its women's swim team from 2021 to 2022. In March 2022, she became the first openly transgender athlete to win an NCAA Division I national championship in any sport, after winning the women's 500-yard freestyle event. Beginning in 2021, she became part of the public debate about transgender women in sports.

Early life and education 
Thomas grew up in Austin, Texas, and has an older brother. She began swimming at the age of five, and was sixth in the state high school swimming championships, competing for Westlake High School. In 2017, she started attending the University of Pennsylvania. She graduated in 2022 and plans to attend law school, pursuing a career as a civil rights attorney.

Towards the end of high school, Thomas began to question her gender identity. After her freshman year at college, during the summer of 2018, she came out as transgender to her family. She began using her new name on New Year's Day in 2020. In an interview with Sports Illustrated she said, "In a way, it was sort of a rebirth, for the first time in my life, feeling fully connected to my name and who I am and living who I am. I am Lia."

Swimming career
Thomas began swimming on the men's team at the University of Pennsylvania in 2017, and during her freshman year, recorded a time of 8 minutes and 57.55 seconds in the 1,000-yard freestyle that ranked as the sixth-fastest national men's time, as well as 500-yard freestyle and 1,650-yard freestyle times ranked within the national top 100. On the men's swim team in 2018–2019, Thomas finished second in the men's 500, 1,000, and 1,650-yard freestyle at the Ivy League championships as a sophomore in 2019. During the 2018–2019 season, Thomas recorded the top university men's team times in the 500 free, 1000 free, and 1650 free.

She began transitioning using hormone replacement therapy in May 2019, and came out as a trans woman during her junior year to her coaches, friends, and the women's and men's swim teams at the University of Pennsylvania. She was required to swim for the men's team in the 2019–2020 academic year as a junior while undergoing hormone therapy and then swam on the women's team in 2021–2022 after taking a year off school to maintain her eligibility to compete while competitive swimming was canceled due to the COVID-19 pandemic. Thomas has followed all of the gender-related policies to be eligible to compete as a woman in NCAA swimming.

Thomas lost muscle mass and strength through testosterone suppression and hormone replacement therapy. Her time for the 500 freestyle is over 15 seconds slower than her personal bests before medically transitioning. Thomas's event progression peaked in 2019 for distance swimming, with a drop in times during the 2021–22 season. Her event progression for sprint swimming reflected a dip at the start of 2021–22 season before returning to near-lifetime bests in the 100 free and a lifetime personal best in the 50 free in 2021.

In the 2018–2019 season she was, when competing in the men's team, ranked 554th in the 200 freestyle, 65th in the 500 freestyle, and 32nd in the 1650 freestyle. In the 2021–2022 season, those ranks are now, when competing in the women's team, fifth in the 200 freestyle, first in the 500 freestyle, and eighth in the 1650 freestyle. According to an archived page of the swimming data website Swimcloud, Thomas was ranked 89th among male college swimmers for that season.

In a race during January 2022 at a meet against UPenn's Ivy League rival Yale, Thomas finished in 6th place in the 100m freestyle race, losing to four cisgender women and Iszac Henig, a transgender man, who transitioned without hormone therapy.

In March 2022, Thomas became the first openly transgender athlete to win an NCAA Division I national championship in any sport, after winning the women's 500-yard freestyle with a time of 4:33.24; Olympic silver medalist Emma Weyant was second with a time 1.75 seconds behind Thomas. Thomas did not break any records at the NCAA event, while Kate Douglass broke 18 NCAA records. Thomas was 9.18 seconds short of Katie Ledecky's NCAA record of 4:24.06. In the preliminaries for the 200 freestyle, Thomas finished second. In the final for the 200 freestyle, Thomas placed fifth with a time of 1:43.50. In the preliminaries for the 100 freestyle, Thomas finished tenth. In the finals for the 100 freestyle, Thomas placed eighth out of eight competitors in 48.18 seconds, finishing last.

The March 2022 NCAA championship was Thomas's last college swimming event. By the conclusion of Thomas's swimming career at UPenn in 2022, her rank had moved from 65th on the men's team to 1st on the women's team in the 500-yard freestyle, and 554th on the men's team to 5th on the women's team in the 200-yard freestyle. According to the swimming data website Swimcloud, Thomas is ranked 36th among female college swimmers in the United States for the 2021–2022 season, and 46th among women swimmers nationally. According to Sports Illustrated, she has applied for law school and planned to swim at the 2024 Summer Olympics trials.

In a May 2022 interview with Good Morning America, Thomas defended herself from criticism, said that "I intend to keep swimming", and that "It's been a goal of mine to swim at Olympic trials for a very long time, and I would love to see that through." In an interview with ESPN, Thomas said "It has been incredibly rewarding and meaningful to be able to be authentic and to be myself.

In June 2022, the International Swimming Federation (FINA), an organization that administers international aquatic sports competitions, voted to bar all transgender athletes from competing in professional women's swimming, with the exception of athletes who "can establish to FINA's comfortable satisfaction that they have not experienced any part of male puberty beyond Tanner Stage 2 (of puberty) or before age 12, whichever is later", barring Thomas from competing in the women's competition at the 2024 Paris Olympics as she had planned. In response to the decision, Thomas said: "The new FINA release is deeply upsetting. It is discriminatory and will only serve to harm all women."

In July 2022, the University of Pennsylvania nominated Thomas for the 2022 NCAA Woman of the Year Award, one out of 577 athletes nominated for this award.

Public debate

In 2021, conservative and right-wing media began widely covering Thomas, including Fox News. In early December, anonymous parents of University of Pennsylvania swim team members wrote to the NCAA, seeking for Thomas to be declared ineligible to compete. In December 2021, USA Swimming official Cynthia Millen resigned after 30 years in protest of Thomas's eligibility to compete and then appeared on the Fox News show The Ingraham Angle. In a January 10, 2022, article, The Washington Post wrote, "Thomas has shattered school records and has posted the fastest times of any female college swimmer in two events this season. She'll probably be a favorite at the NCAA championships in March, even as people inside and outside the sport debate her place on the pool deck."

In January 2022, the University of Pennsylvania, multiple organizations affiliated with the University of Pennsylvania Law School, and the Ivy League issued statements supporting Thomas. In February 2022, sixteen anonymous members of the University of Pennsylvania women's swimming team sent a letter to the university and Ivy League officials asking them not to take legal action against the NCAA's proposed transgender athlete policy that could prevent Thomas from competing in the NCAA championships, and said that Thomas's rank "bounced from #462 as a male to #1 as a female". Another group of swimmers from Thomas's swim team made a separate statement supporting her competing on the women's team. The anonymous letter also led to another letter in response, organized by Schuyler Bailar and signed by more than 300 current and former collegiate swimmers, stating their "support for Lia Thomas, and all transgender college athletes, who deserve to be able to participate in safe and welcoming athletic environments".

Brooke Forde, an Olympic silver medalist, said of Thomas that: "I believe that treating people with respect and dignity is more important than any trophy or record will ever be, which is why I will not have a problem racing against Lia at NCAAs this year". Another swimmer, Olympic silver medalist Erica Sullivan, spoke in support of Thomas in an opinion piece for Newsweek: "like anyone else in this sport, Lia has trained diligently to get to where she is and has followed all of the rules and guidelines put before her ... she doesn't win every time. And when she does, she deserves, like anyone else in this sport, to be celebrated for her hard-won success, not labeled a cheater simply because of her identity." 23-time Olympic gold medalist Michael Phelps said that "I believe that we all should feel comfortable with who we are in our own skin, but I think sports should all be played on an even playing field" and "I don't know what that looks like in the future. But it's – it's – it's – it's hard. It's a really ... honestly ... I don't know what to say." 3-time Olympic gold medalist Nancy Hogshead-Makar supported the participation of trans women, "so long as they can demonstrate that they have lost their sex-linked, male-puberty advantage prior to competition in the women's category."

In February 2022, Vicky Hartzler, a Republican Senate candidate in Missouri, featured Thomas in a campaign advertisement asserting that "Women's sports are for women, not men pretending to be women", which was described by CNN as "a transphobic trope belittling trans women". In March, roughly 50 protesters and counter-protesters gathered outside the Georgia Tech Aquatic Center when Thomas swam in the NCAA Division I national championship. Some in the stands carried banners saying "Save Women's Sports". On day 2 of the championships, around 10 protesters from the group "Save Women's Sports" protested during the preliminaries of the women's 500 freestyle. Reka Gyorgy finished in 17th place in the 500-yard freestyle event which Thomas won, one place short of qualifying for finals, and complained to the NCAA. On March 22, Florida governor Ron DeSantis issued a proclamation declaring second-place finisher Emma Weyant the "rightful winner" of the 2022 NCAA Division 1 Women's 500-yard Freestyle, although he does not have the authority to select the winner of the NCAA championship. In March, Colorado representative Lauren Boebert introduced a bill co-sponsored by 20 other Republicans that honors Weyant. Caitlyn Jenner said that Thomas was not the "rightful winner", adding "It's not transphobic or anti-trans, it's common sense!", while social media users responded by pointing out Jenner has previously expressed support for transgender athletes and has competed in women's golf.

In February 2022, CNN described Thomas as "the face of the debate on transgender women in sports", and in March 2022, Sports Illustrated described her as "the most controversial athlete in America". On March 23, after Indiana governor Eric Holcomb vetoed a legislative ban on the participation of transgender girls in school sports for girls, The New York Times wrote, "Sports participation by transgender girls and women has become an increasingly divisive topic among political leaders and sports sanctioning groups, which have struggled with the issue in a way that respects transgender athletes and addresses concerns some critics have raised about competitive fairness" and reported that Utah governor Spencer Cox, at a press conference before his veto of similar legislation, stated to the transgender community, "We care about you. We love you. It's going to be OK. We're going to get through this together." As of June 2022, Alabama, Arizona, Arkansas, Florida, Georgia, Idaho, Indiana, Iowa, Kentucky, Louisiana, Mississippi, Montana, Oklahoma, South Carolina, South Dakota, Tennessee, Texas, Utah, and West Virginia have laws prohibiting public schools from allowing the participation of transgender girls in school sports for girls.

In a report about the issue of gender identity being raised during the confirmation hearing for U.S. Supreme Court nominee Ketanji Brown Jackson, The New York Times wrote that after the vetoes by Holcomb and Cox, as well as the win by Thomas at the NCAA championship, "Transgender rights are dominating outrage on the right". On March 31, The Hill described the debate over the participation of transgender athletes in sports as "the latest flashpoint in the country's culture wars" and wrote "Lia Thomas became the latest transgender athlete caught in the debate's crosshairs" after her NCAA win. The National Women's Law Center, a non-profit organization, defended Thomas, saying that she "deserves all the celebration for her success this season, but instead is being met with nationwide misogyny and transphobia". The American Civil Liberties Union (ACLU) also defended Thomas, saying that "It's not a women's sport if it doesn't include ALL women athletes" and that "Lia Thomas belongs on the Penn swimming and diving team."

Swimming records

Personal bests 
SCY (Short course)

Penn men's swim team records 
SCY

Penn women's swim team records 
SCY

Notes

References

External links
 Lia Thomas (SwimCloud)

1990s births
2022 controversies in the United States
Living people
American female swimmers
LGBT people from Texas
LGBT swimmers
Penn Quakers men's swimmers 
Penn Quakers women's swimmers 
Swimming controversies
Sportspeople from Austin, Texas
Transgender history in the United States
Transgender sportswomen
Westlake High School (Texas) alumni